Novo Konjsko is a village located in the Gevgelija Municipality of North Macedonia.

Demographics
As of the 2021 census, Novo Konjsko had 168 residents with the following ethnic composition:
Macedonians 155
Persons for whom data are taken from administrative sources 9
Others 4 

According to the 2002 census, the village had a total of 136 inhabitants. Ethnic groups in the village include:
Macedonians 134
Serbs 2

References

Villages in Gevgelija Municipality